The Anglican Church of the Holy Cross in Weston Bampfylde, Sparkford, Somerset, England, was built in the 13th century. It is a Grade II* listed building.

History

The church was built in the 13th century and refurbished in the 15th. A Victorian restoration was carried out in the 19th century.

Following an inspection in 2010 repair work was carried out on the stonework of the tower.

The parish is part of the Cam Vale benefice within the Diocese of Bath and Wells. It became part of the Sparkford Parish in 1933.

Architecture

The stone building has hamstone dressings and slate roofs. It consists of a two-bay chancel and three-bay nave with a vestry and south porch. The four-stage west tower is octagonal in its upper stages.

Inside the church are a 17th-century timber pulpit and 12th century stone font.

See also  
 List of ecclesiastical parishes in the Diocese of Bath and Wells

References

Grade II* listed buildings in South Somerset
Grade II* listed churches in Somerset
Church of England church buildings in South Somerset